The 1926–27 season was Arsenal's 8th consecutive season in the top division of English football.

Results
Arsenal's score comes first

Legend

Football League First Division

Final League table

FA Cup

See also

 1926–27 in English football
 List of Arsenal F.C. seasons

References

English football clubs 1926–27 season
1926-27